St. John's Episcopal Church, built in 1888,  is an historic church located at 515 East Division Street in Springfield, Missouri. It is listed on the city of Springfield's register of historic sites.

History
In 1881, a small but dedicated number of Christ Church members recognized the need for a second Episcopal parish in Springfield. A location was selected, and on March 19, 1886, the organizational meeting was held. A six-member vestry was elected, a plan for financial support was developed, and application was made for a Certification of Incorporation. The building was completed in 1888 and the first liturgy was celebrated on September 23 with 123 communicant members present.

On May 1, 1978, the church was presented a plaque designating it as an historical site.

References

External links
 St. John's Episcopal Church
 The Springfield Library maintains a collection of historic postcards with Springfield landmarks on its Web site, and St. John's is listed there.

Churches completed in 1888
19th-century Episcopal church buildings
Episcopal church buildings in Missouri
Churches in Springfield, Missouri
1886 establishments in Missouri